Idioglossa miraculosa is a moth of the family Batrachedridae. It was described by Frey and Boll in 1878. It is found in North America, where it has been recorded from Florida, Illinois, North Carolina, Ohio, Tennessee and Texas.

The wingspan is about 10 mm. There are two or three generations per year.

The larvae feed on Dichanthelium clandestinum. They skeletonize the leaves of their host plant.

References

Batrachedridae
Moths described in 1878
Moths of North America